Vastogirardi is a comune (municipality) in the Province of Isernia in the Italian region Molise, located about  northwest of Campobasso and about  north of Isernia.

Vastogirardi borders the following municipalities: Agnone, Capracotta, Carovilli, Castel di Sangro, Forlì del Sannio, Rionero Sannitico, Roccasicura, San Pietro Avellana.

Demographic evolution

References

External links
 www.comune.vastogirardi.is.it//

Cities and towns in Molise